The 2011 Chinese Figure Skating Championships were held between December 23 and 24, 2010 in Qiqihar. Skaters competed in the disciplines of men's singles, ladies' singles, pair skating, and ice dancing.

Results

Men

Ladies

Pairs

Ice dancing

External links
 results

2011
2010 in figure skating
2011 in figure skating